The Rivière Cachée (English: Hidden River) is a tributary of the Saint-Maurice River, flowing on the north bank of the Saint Lawrence River, entirely in the town of Notre-Dame-du-Mont-Carmel, in the Les Chenaux Regional County Municipality, in the administrative region of Mauricie, in the province of Quebec, in Canada.

The course of the Hidden River descends mainly in the forest zone, passing on the west side of the village of Notre-Dame-du-Mont-Carmel.

Geography 
The Hidden River rises at the mouth of Valmont Lake. This lake is located in the southern part of a large swamp area which extends in the sector of Shawinigan-Sud, in Lac-à-la-Tortue and Saint-Narcisse. This source is located at:
  north of the village of Notre-Dame-du-Mont-Carmel;
  east of downtown Shawinigan-Sud;
  south-east of the village center of Saint-Narcisse.

  towards the south-west, by crossing the chemin du rang Saint-Louis, up to the Lamothe road bridge;
  south-west, up to the Chemin Saint-Louis road bridge;

The Cachée river flows on the east bank of the Saint-Maurice river upstream of the La Gabelle dam. The confluence of the Cachée river is located upstream of the La Gabelle dam at:
  upstream of the La Gabelle dam;
  south-east of the railway bridge spanning the Saint-Maurice river.

Toponymy 
The sinuousness of its course at the bottom of a flow in the lower part explains the hidden character of the river. The Hidden Coast of the old road segment connecting Shawinigan-Sud and Cap-de-la-Madeleine included curves at the bottom of the flow which formerly caused several road accidents.

The toponym Rivière Cachée was formalized on December 5, 1968, at the Commission de toponymie du Québec.

References

Appendices

Related articles 
 Notre-Dame-du-Mont-Carmel, a municipality
 Saint-Maurice River, a stream
 St. Lawrence River, a stream
 List of rivers of the Saint-Maurice basin
 List of rivers of Quebec

External links 

Rivers of Mauricie
Les Chenaux Regional County Municipality